Mario Almondo (born 17 September 1964) is an Italian engineer.

Almondo has more than 23 years of experience in Ferrari S.p.A. covering several special responsibilities inside Ferrari Group, among others: COO, Executive Senior Vice President, Head of Quality, Executive Senior Vice President Head of Human Resources and Organisation for Ferrari Automotive Group, Executive Senior Vice President COO and Technical Director of Formula 1; Consultant for several companies in the high tech field (automotive, aerospace, industrial  and motor sport industries). Entrepreneur Starting-up New-cos in the luxury segment and patents in the mass distribution domain. Almondo worked in Brembo China as President and CEO, and is currently C.O.O. of Brembo S.p.A. Performance Division. Almondo has become a member of the  FIA (International Federation of Automobile) Safety Commission.

Career
A native of Turin, Almondo studied engineering and industrial management at the Politecnico of Milan. After brief spells as a lecturer at the local university, military service as tenant in the Carabinieri, and a brief experience as Commercial Director of SIRA, he joined Ferrari in 1991 as an engineer. After working both in Ferrari's road and race car divisions, he was promoted to become Industrial Director of the F1 operation in 1995.
Following Ross Brawn's decision to leave Ferrari in October 2006, Almondo took his role of Technical Director. On 12 November 2007 he was made operations director of Ferrari Gestione Sportiva (F1). Under his leadership, Ferrari won F1 Constructors' Championship and F1 Drivers' Championship with Kimi Räikkönen. He is the last Italian and youngest Technical Director winning both F1 Championships at Ferrari (drivers and manufacturers). In April 2009 he was nominated as Quality Senior Vice President of Ferrari S.p.A. and in October 2011 as COO Industrial Director Senior Vice President of Ferrari S.p.A..In February 2013 he left the Scuderia Ferrari to find new stimuli, but according to rumors, for the incompatibility with a leading figure of the leadership team. 
In January 2015 Mario Almondo joined Brembo S.p.A.- an acknowledged world leader and innovator in the field of automotive disc brake technology, from January 2015 to April 2017 Almondo was in charge of maximizing the Business of Brembo in China and new customers, market shares and news factories acquisition or construction from green fields are key part of the mission. Since April 2017 Mario Almondo returned to Brembo S.p.A. as General Manager of Performance Division.

Honors
Officer of the Order of Merit of the Italian Republic on May 10, 2004.

References

External links
Grandprix.com article, retrieved October 27, 2006.
Corriere.it
Gazzetta.it
Quirinale.it-Dettaglio decorato-Ing.Mario Almondo
Mario Almondo: la mia sfida? Inizio un nuovo lavoro in Cina
Twitter.com
Fatturato in crescita per Brembo
La sfida di Brembo in Cina

1964 births
Living people
Automotive engineers from Turin
Formula One engineers
Formula One designers
Ferrari people
Polytechnic University of Milan alumni
Italian motorsport people